René Bliard (18 October 1932 – 27 September 2009) was a French professional football striker who was a member of Stade de Reims in the 1950s. He was also part of France's squad for the 1952 Summer Olympics, but he did not play in any matches.

Honours
 Division 1: 1955, 1958
 Coupe de France: 1958
 European Cup: Runner-up 1956

References

External links
 
 
 

1932 births
2009 deaths
Sportspeople from Marne (department)
French footballers
Association football midfielders
Association football forwards
Stade de Reims players
Red Star F.C. players
FC Rouen players
Ligue 1 players
Olympic footballers of France
France international footballers
Footballers at the 1952 Summer Olympics
Footballers from Grand Est